Chak/village 151/P is a small area in Sadiqabad, Rahim Yar Khan District, Punjab, Pakistan. Its postal code is 64351.

References

External links
 Maplandia

Populated places in Rahim Yar Khan District